Shattered is a 1921 German silent Kammerspielfilm directed by Lupu Pick, written by Carl Mayer, and is considered to be the earliest example of the kammerspielfilm.

Plot 
Set during the winter, the story tells the tale of a track checker and his family who live a monotonous and poverty-stricken life next to a railway line. They receive a telegram announcing the arrival of the section inspector, who is to live with the family.

Cast 
 Werner Krauss as the track checker
 Edith Posca as the track checker's daughter
 Hermine Straßmann-Witt as the track checker's wife
 Paul Otto as the section inspector
 Lupu Pick as Reisender

External links

References 

1921 films
German black-and-white films
Films directed by Lupu Pick
Films of the Weimar Republic
Films set in Germany
German Expressionist films
German silent feature films
Films with screenplays by Carl Mayer